The Cursed Village (Spanish: La aldea maldita) is a 1942 Spanish drama film directed by Florián Rey and starring Florencia Bécquer, Julio Rey de las Heras and Victoria Franco. A remake of an earlier silent film of the same title, it was a popular box office success It was awarded as medal at the 1942 Venice Film Festival.

Plot 
The events take place in the town of Luján in Salamanca at the beginning of the 20th century. Due to a series of weather misfortunes for several years in a row, the town finds itself in a situation of poverty and misery that forces its inhabitants to emigrate to the city in search of a job that mitigates their problems; Juan, a farmer in a good situation, is forced, along with his sharecroppers and servants, to do the same, leaving his wife and son in the village; but his wife, Acacia, decides to leave too; not with him, but by another path that will lead her to prostitution and degradation; After a while Juan returns to the village and recovers his situation and his wealth; Acacia also returns, but turned into a beggar whom Juan's shepherds recognize; he goes to look for her and returns her home after forgiving her slips.

Cast
In alphabetical order
 Florencia Bécquer 
 Julio Rey de las Heras 
 Victoria Franco 
 Pablo Hidalgo 
 Delfín Jerez 
 Agustín Laguilhoat 
 Alicia Romay 
 José Sepúlveda

References

Bibliography 
 Bentley, Bernard. A Companion to Spanish Cinema. Boydell & Brewer 2008.

External links 
 

1942 drama films
Spanish drama films
1942 films
1940s Spanish-language films
Films directed by Florián Rey
Remakes of Spanish films

Sound film remakes of silent films
Spanish black-and-white films
Films about internal migration
1940s Spanish films